China National Highway 225 runs from Haikou in Hainan to Sanya, Hainan. It is 429 kilometres in length. It is the western part of Hainan Ring Highway. (The eastern part of the ring is China National Highway 223).

Along most of its length, Highway 225 parallels Hainan Western Ring Railway.

Route and distance

See also 

 China National Highways

Transport in Hainan
225